Roman Kots (born 12 September 1984) is a retired Ukrainian footballer.

External links
 
 
 

1984 births
Living people
Ukrainian footballers
Association football defenders
Ukrainian expatriate footballers
Expatriate footballers in Belarus
Expatriate footballers in Moldova
Expatriate footballers in Kazakhstan
FC Kovel-Volyn Kovel players
FC Volyn Lutsk players
FC Ikva Mlyniv players
FC Nistru Otaci players
FC Zhetysu players
FC Dynamo Brest players
FC Hoverla Uzhhorod players
MFC Mykolaiv players
Footballers from Lutsk